A dot is usually a small, round spot.

Dot, DoT or DOT may also refer to:

Orthography 
 Full stop or "period", a sentence terminator 
 Dot (diacritic), a mark above or below a character (e.g. ȧ, ạ, İ, Ċ, ċ, etc.), usually to indicate sound mutation
 Interpunct also known as an "interpoint", "middle dot", "middot", "centered dot" or "centred dot", a punctuation mark

Mathematics
 "Dot as decimal point", the form of decimal separator generally used in anglophone countries, e.g., $24.99
 Dot operator, a notation used to signify multiplication
 Dot product, algebraic operation returning a single number from two equal-length sequences

Arts and entertainment 
 The Dot (Toyism), a work of art in Emmen, the Netherlands
 "Dot" (song), a single by the Los Angeles pop punk band ALL
 "Dot", a song by Destiny's Child featured on the Charlie's Angels soundtrack
 Dot, A Drama in Three Acts, an 1859 stage adaption of the book The Cricket on the Hearth by Charles Dickens
 The Dot (book), a 2003 children's picture book
 The Dot (computer), a portable computer
 Dot., a 2013 children's book adapted into a 2016 TV series
 Dot (film), a 2010 British animated short film
 The Dot (restaurant), a fictional café in Degrassi: The Next Generation
 WTTK, A local television station broadcasting as "The Dot"

Government agencies 
 Department of Telecommunications, India
 Department of Tourism (Philippines)
 Department for Transport, UK, formerly the Department of Transport (DoT)
 In Australia:
 Department of Transport (1930–1932)
 Department of Transport (1941–1950)
 Department of Transport (1972–1982)
 Department of Transport (1983–1987)
 Department of Transport (1993–1996)
 Department of Transport (Victoria, 2008–13)
 Department of Transport (Victoria) (current)
 Department of Transport (Western Australia)
 Department of Transport (South Africa)
 Department of Transportation (New Brunswick), Canada
 Department of Transportation, USA
 Departure Order Tracking, term used by Citizenship and Immigration Canada
 Taxation Administration, Taiwan

Companies 
 Dot Cycle and Motor Manufacturing Company, a British motorcycle manufacturing company established in 1903
 Dot Foods, the largest foodservice redistribution company in the United States
 Dot Records, an American company

Technology
Dot (dit), an element in Morse code
Dot (Unix)
DOT (graph description language), in computation, the plain-text format for describing graphs used by Graphviz software
".", the DNS root zone, the root domain of the Domain Name System
DoT, DNS over TLS
DOT code, an alphanumeric character sequence for purposes of tire identification
Damage over time, in computer and video games
Designated Order Turnaround or SuperDot, an electronic system used by NYSE to route market orders
Diffuse optical imaging, also known as diffuse optical tomography, a medical imaging technique
Directly observed treatment, a way to administer medicine
Dissolved oxygen tension (DOT)
Dutch Open Telescope
The Dot, an Office Assistant, one of several interactive animated characters in Microsoft Office
Amazon Echo Dot, also called the Dot, part of a brand of smart speakers developed by Amazon

Places 
 Dot, Kentucky, United States, an unincorporated community
 Dot, Michigan, ghost town
 Lake Dot, Orlando, Florida, United States
 Dot Cliff, Victoria Land, Antarctica
 Dot Peak, Oates Land, Antarctica
 Dot Island (disambiguation)
 Dorchester, Boston, Massachusetts, United States

People, fictional characters, and mascots 
 Dot (given name), a list of people and fictional characters
 Pedro Dot (1885–1976), Spanish rose breeder
 Admiral Dot, stage name of Leopold S. Kahn (1859 or 1863–1918), a dwarf performer for P. T. Barnum
 Dot, the mascot of PBS Kids since 1999

Other uses 
 Tropical Storm Dot (disambiguation), several tropical storms
 Deed of trust (disambiguation), several meanings
 Dictionary of Occupational Titles
 Dot (mango), a cultivar from Florida
 Epiphone Dot, a series of archtop guitars

See also 
 .dot (disambiguation)
 Dots (disambiguation)
 Dot notation (disambiguation)
 Dotted note, in music notation (  𝅭 )
 Dot dot dot (disambiguation)
 Bullet (typography) (•)
 Two dots (disambiguation)
 Three dots (disambiguation)